Achtrup (North Frisian: Åktoorp) is a municipality in Nordfriesland district, in Schleswig-Holstein in northern Germany.

Besides standard German, Low German and South Jutlandic, a Danish dialect, are still spoken in the area.

References

Nordfriesland